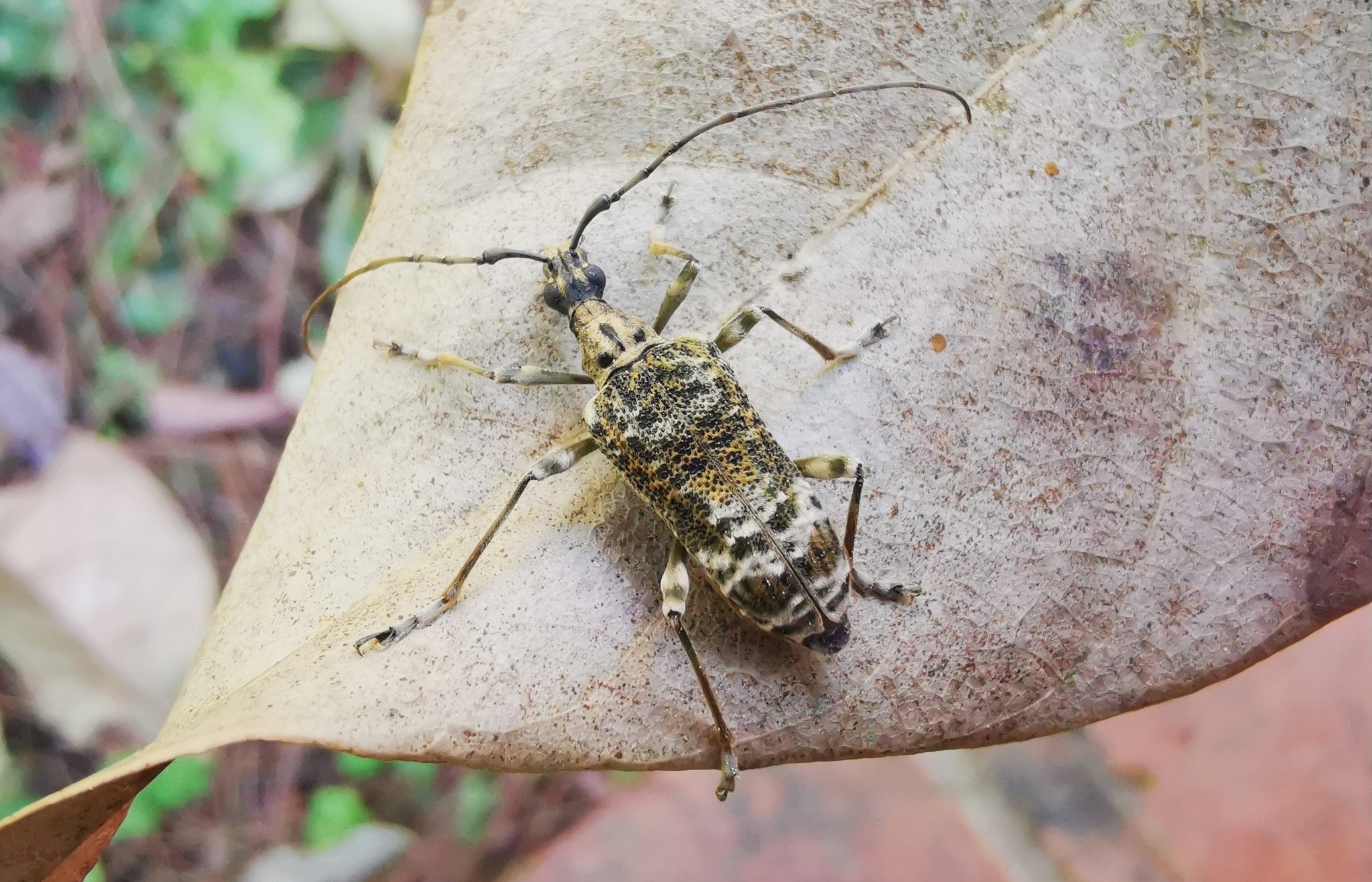

Scientific classification
- Kingdom: Animalia
- Phylum: Arthropoda
- Class: Insecta
- Order: Coleoptera
- Suborder: Polyphaga
- Infraorder: Cucujiformia
- Family: Cerambycidae
- Genus: Acapnolymma; Gressitt & Rondon, 1970
- Species: A. sulcaticeps

Binomial name
- Acapnolymma sulcaticeps (Pic, 1923)

= Acapnolymma =

Acapnolymma sulcaticeps

Species of beetle

Acapnolymma is a genus species of beetle in the family Cerambycidae. It is monotypic, being represented by the single species Acapnolymma sulcaticeps.
